Bergen Port is an international seaport located in the centre of Bergen, Norway, operated by Bergen Port Authority. Port locations are featured along most of the two bays in Bergen, Vågen and Puddefjorden. In 2006 it served 27,342 calls with 68 million tonnes of cargo and 109,000 containersas well as 600,000 cruise ship passengers. The port has 5,500 meters of quays with draft at 11 meters. Warehouses with capacity of 50,000 square meters are co-located with the port.

Passenger routes

Cruiseferries
 Fjord Line to (Stavanger, Hirtshals)
 Hurtigruten Group (Coastal Express calls daily at ports north to Kirkenes)

Fast ferries
 Fjord1 Fylkesbaatane to (Flåm, Sogndal and Selje)
 Tide (Haugesund, Stavanger, Sunnhordaland, Austevoll)

External links
 Bergen Port Authority 

Transport in Bergen
Ports and harbours of Norway
Water transport in Vestland